German Aleksandrovich Lovchev (born 10 June 1981) is a former Russian professional footballer.

He made his professional debut in the Russian Second Division in 1998 for FC Energiya Velikiye Luki. He played 1 game in the UEFA Champions League 2001–02 for FC Spartak Moscow.

Honours
 Russian Premier League champion: 2000, 2001.
 A Lyga 3rd place: 2006.

References

1981 births
People from Velikiye Luki
Living people
Russian footballers
FC Spartak Moscow players
Russian Premier League players
FC Elista players
Russian expatriate footballers
Expatriate footballers in Lithuania
Expatriate footballers in Finland
Association football forwards
FC Moscow players
FC Avangard Kursk players
Sportspeople from Pskov Oblast
FC Olimp-Dolgoprudny players